If It Were Love is a French documentary film, directed by Patric Chiha and released in 2020. The film profiles the professional and personal lives of the dancers in Crowd, a touring piece by choreographer Gisèle Vienne about the rave scene of the 1990s.

The film had its theatrical premiere in February 2020 in the Panorama Dokumente stream at the 70th Berlin International Film Festival, where it won the award for Best Documentary from the Teddy Award program for LGBTQ-themed films.

The film had its public theatrical premiere in France in March 2020.

References

External links
 

2020 films
2020 documentary films
2020s French-language films
French documentary films
2020 LGBT-related films
Documentary films about LGBT topics
French LGBT-related films
Documentary films about dance
2020s French films